An appeal to probability (or appeal to possibility, also known as possibiliter ergo probabiliter, "possibly, therefore probably") is the logical fallacy of taking something for granted because it would probably be the case (or might possibly be the case). Inductive arguments lack deductive validity and must therefore be asserted or denied in the premises. A mere possibility does not correlate with a probability, and a mere probability does not correlate to a certainty, nor is just any probability that something happened or will happen sufficient to qualify as knowing that it did or will happen.

Example
A fallacious appeal to possibility:
Something can go wrong .
Therefore, something will go wrong .

If I do not bring my umbrella 
It will rain. .

Murphy's law is a (typically deliberate, tongue-in-cheek) invocation of the fallacy.

References

Notes

Bibliography

Inductive fallacies
Probability fallacies